Dear Sarah is a 1990 made-for-television film about Giuseppe Conlon who was wrongfully sentenced to twelve years imprisonment after being implicated as one of the Maguire Seven during the 1970s. The film was produced by Raidió Teilifís Éireann, directed by Frank Cvitanovich and written by Tom McGurk. It starred Stella McCusker, Barry McGovern and Paddy Rocks, and was aired in 1990 by RTÉ in Ireland and on the ITV Network in the United Kingdom.

Plot summary

The film is based on the letters Giuseppe Conlon wrote from prison to his wife Sarah after he was wrongfully convicted in 1976 along with seven members of the Maguire family of running an IRA bomb factory in North London. Conlon received twelve years imprisonment but died in custody in 1980.

Sarah Conlon spent many years campaigning to clear the names of her husband, and son Gerry (who had been wrongly jailed over the 1974 Guildford pub bombings). The others jailed along with Giuseppe Conlon were later released after serving their sentences, and the convictions were quashed on appeal in 1991. The Guildford Four had their convictions overturned in 1989.

Cast

 Stella McCusker – Sarah Conlon
 Barry McGovern – Giuseppe Conlon
 Paddy Rocks – Gerry Conlon
 Bronagh Gallagher – Anne Conlon
 Janice McAdam – Bridgid Conlon
 Elsa Johns – Young Sarah
 Eileen Pollock – Mary Kelly
 P.H. Moriarty – Warder Deans

Awards
Stella McCusker won a Jacob's Award for her performance as Sarah Conlon.

See also

In the Name of the Father, a 1993 film which also relates events surrounding the Guildford Four case.

Sources

External links

1990 television films
1990 films
1990 in Irish television
Irish television films
English-language Irish films
1990 drama films
Irish biographical films
Films about The Troubles (Northern Ireland)
Films about the Irish Republican Army
Films set in Northern Ireland
Films shot in the Republic of Ireland
Political drama films
RTÉ original programming
1990s prison films
1990s English-language films